A center of excellence (COE or CoE), also called excellence center, is a team, a shared facility or an entity that provides leadership, best practices, research, support or training for a focus area.

Due to its broad usage and vague legal precedent, a "center of excellence" in one context may have completely different characteristics from another. The focus area might be a technology (e.g. Java), a business concept (e.g. BPM), a skill (e.g. negotiation) or a broad area of study (e.g. women's health). A center of excellence may also be aimed at revitalizing stalled initiatives. The term may also refer to a network of institutions collaborating with each other to pursue excellence in a particular area. (e.g. the Rochester Area Colleges Center for Excellence in Math and Science).

Organizations 
Within an organization, a center of excellence may refer to a group of people, a department or a shared facility. It may also be known as a competency center, or as a capability center, or as an excellence center. Stephen Jenner and Craig Kilford, in Management of Portfolios, mention COE as a coordinating function which ensures that change initiatives are delivered consistently and well, through standard processes and competent staff. In technology companies, the center of excellence concept is often associated with new software tools, technologies or associated business concepts such as service-oriented architecture or business intelligence.

Academia 
In academic institutions, a center of excellence often refers to a team with a clear focus on a particular area of research; such a center may bring together faculty members from different disciplines and provide shared facilities.

Australia
In Australia, the Australian Research Council (ARC) funds a competitive grant program for centres of excellence which link a number of institutions within the country and internationally in a specific field of research. New centres are funded every three years and each run for seven years.

2020-2027:

 ARC Centre of Excellence for Automated Decision-Making and Society 
 ARC Centre of Excellence for Children and Families over the Life Course 
 ARC Centre of Excellence for Dark Matter Particle Physics
 ARC Centre of Excellence for the Digital Child
 ARC Centre of Excellence for Enabling Eco-Efficient Beneficiation of Minerals
 ARC Centre of Excellence for Innovations in Peptide and Protein Science
 ARC Centre of Excellence for Plant Success in Nature and Agriculture
 ARC Centre of Excellence in Synthetic Biology
 ARC Centre of Excellence for Transformative Meta-Optical Systems

2017-2024:

 ARC Centre of Excellence for All Sky Astrophysics in 3 Dimensions
 ARC Centre of Excellence for Australian Biodiversity and Heritage
 ARC Centre of Excellence for Climate Extremes
 ARC Centre of Excellence for Engineered Quantum Systems
 ARC Centre of Excellence in Exciton Science
 ARC Centre of Excellence in Future Low-Energy Electronics Technologies
 ARC Centre of Excellence for Gravitational Wave Discovery
 ARC Centre of Excellence in Population Ageing Research
 ARC Centre of Excellence for Quantum Computation and Communication Technology

2014-2021:

 ARC Centre of Excellence in Advanced Molecular Imaging
 ARC Centre of Excellence for Children and Families over the Life Course
 ARC Centre of Excellence in Convergent Bio-Nano Science and Technology
 ARC Centre of Excellence for the Dynamics of Language
 ARC Centre of Excellence for Electromaterials Science
 ARC Centre of Excellence for Integrated Coral Reef Studies
 ARC Centre of Excellence for Integrative Brain Function
 ARC Centre of Excellence for Mathematical and Statistical Frontiers of Big Data, Big Models, New Insights
 ARC Centre of Excellence for Nanoscale BioPhotonics
 ARC Centre of Excellence in Plant Energy Biology
 ARC Centre of Excellence for Robotic Vision
 ARC Centre of Excellence for Translational Photosynthesis

2011-2018

 ARC Centre of Excellence for All-sky Astrophysics
 ARC Centre of Excellence for Climate System Science
 ARC Centre of Excellence in Cognition and its Disorders
 ARC Centre of Excellence for Core to Crust Fluid System
 ARC Centre of Excellence for Engineered Quantum Systems
 ARC Centre of Excellence for Environmental Decisions
 ARC Centre of Excellence for Geotechnical Science and Engineering
 ARC Centre of Excellence for the History of Emotions
 ARC Centre of Excellence for Particle Physics at the Tera-Scale
 ARC Centre of Excellence in Plant Cell Wall Biology
 ARC Centre of Excellence in Population Ageing Research
 ARC Centre of Excellence for Quantum Computation and Communication Technology
 ARC Centre of Excellence for Ultrahigh Bandwidth Devices for Optical Systems

2004/5-2013

 ARC Centre of Excellence for Creative Industries and Innovation (CCI)
 ARC Centre for Complex Systems

Philippines
In the Philippines, a center of excellence (COE) is a certification given by the Commission on Higher Education to departments within a higher education institution (e.g. a college within a university) which "continuously demonstrates excellent performance in the areas of instruction, research and publication, extension and linkages and institutional qualifications". Candidates for this certification are referred as centers of development (CODs) by the education body.

Russia

In Russia, the Center of Excellence status (in Russian it is used notion Leading scientific school) is granted by the Council for Grants of the President of the Russian Federation since 1996. To obtain the COE status, a group of scientists, usually based on a department at a university or a laboratory at an academic institute, and its leader should have a high scientific reputation and should submit an application, which presents a plan of scientific and educational work for the period of two years, to the council. The council issues a special certificate of the COE status to the leader of the group.

United Kingdom 
In the United Kingdom, schools and sixth forms specialising in an area of curriculum are known as specialist schools. These schools are recognised as centres of excellence in their specialist subject areas. Schools that attained Beacon status were also recognised as centres of excellence, however this status has been discontinued.

Business
Walmart is designating certain employee healthcare venues as Centers of Excellence. In 2013, several regions of the country (Dallas-Fort Worth; Northern Arkansas; Orlando, FL) Walmart is offering employees free treatment when they use the designated Centers of Excellence. Treatments are administered to covered employees, who travel to the Centers, along with a caregiver, for a course of treatment at the center. Depending on the budgetary outcome, Walmart will be sharing its operational results with other employers, as a method of controlling its healthcare costs.

Ford Motor Company has announced a battery center of excellence, meant to centralize a cross-functional team to accelerate the development of battery and battery cell technology. Electrical batteries would then serve as the basis for all-electric vehicles. The Center of Excellence is called Ford Ion Park.

Northrop Grumman has invested in its Manned Aircraft Design Center of Excellence in Melbourne, Florida. This investment uses modeling and simulation tools at the Center of Excellence which predict the performance of its test-bed aircraft, as a method for reducing risk during the process of developing the B-21.

Huntington Ingalls Industries is building out an Unmanned Systems Center of Excellence, which is working on Boeing's project for the Navy's Extra Large Unmanned Undersea Vehicle.

Similarly Alliant Techsystems, Otis Elevator, Alcoa, Greatbatch, and GE have all used Centers of Excellence as organizational mechanisms to gain economies of scale, when discovering and sharing efficiencies of operation.

Asda's Merchandising Centre of Excellence in Leeds contains "a full-size model store for mocking up different shelf layouts and a state-of-the-art virtual reality lab, where Asda and its suppliers can test store layouts and construction plans".

Healthcare 
In the healthcare sector, the term often refers to a center that provides sufficient and easily accessible medical services to patients.
 
In the British NHS, the term is almost always used sarcastically, following its popularisation by Dr Peter Gooderham on the Doctors.net.uk fora. It can often be heard being used to describe tertiary centres by staff working in district general hospitals.

Defence

NATO

Europe
In the European defense community, the European Centre of Excellence for Countering Hybrid Threats is a response to hybrid warfare on its periphery; the COE seeks to inform, and also protect its non-NATO components, as well as its non-PESCO members. The US Department of Defense (DoD) intends to use CoEs that focus on key technologies, such as drones, and commercial satellite imagery.

United States Army 

The Army maintains a Center of Excellence (CoE) at major training installations and other locations:
  Acquisition COE - Huntsville, Alabama
  Aviation COE - Fort Rucker, Alabama
  Cyber COE - Fort Gordon, Georgia
  Fires COE - Fort Sill, Oklahoma
  Human Resource COE - Fort Knox, Kentucky 
  Initial Military Training COE - Fort Eustis, Virginia
  Intelligence COE - Fort Huachuca, Arizona
  Maneuver COE - Fort Benning, Georgia
  Maneuver Support COE Fort Leonard Wood, Missouri
  Medical COE - Joint Base San Antonio (JBSA), Texas
  Mission Command COE - Fort Leavenworth, Kansas 
  NCO Leadership COE - Fort Bliss, Texas
  Space and Missile Defense CoE - Peterson Space Force Base, Colorado
  Special Operations COE - Fort Bragg, North Carolina
  Sustainment COE - Fort Lee, Virginia

TRADOC oversees ten of these Centers of Excellence, each focused on a separate area of expertise within the Army. These centers train over 500,000 Soldiers and service members each year.

See also 

 Homeland Security Centers of Excellence
 Center for Excellence in Disaster Management and Humanitarian Assistance, U.S. Pacific Command
 Rochester Area Colleges Center for Excellence in Math and Science
 Center of Excellence for Stability Police Units
 European Centre of Excellence for Countering Hybrid Threats
 Institute of Air Navigation Services (IANS) – ATM training and e-learning
 Cross-functional team (CFT)

References 

Organizational structure
Medical and health organizations
Scientific organizations
Scientific terminology